The 1948 Tour de France was the 35th edition of the Tour de France, taking place from 30 June to 25 July 1948.

The race was won by Italian cyclist Gino Bartali, who had also won the Tour de France in 1938. Bartali had almost given up during the race, but drew inspiration from a phone call from the Italian prime minister, who asked him to win the Tour de France to prevent civil unrest in Italy after assassination attempt against  Togliatti. Bartali also won the mountains classification, while the team classification was won by the Belgian team.

Innovations and changes
The prize for wearing the yellow jersey was introduced in 1948, sponsored by Les Laines, a French wool company.

In 1947, the media had complained that too many cyclists reached the end of the race, so the race was no longer heroic; this may have motivated a new rule between the third and the eighteenth stage, the rider last in the general classification was eliminated.

Whereas the 1947 Tour de France had been France-centred, the 1948 race became a more cosmopolitan race.

The Tour visited the Saar protectorate for the first time when the 18th stage passed Saarbrücken and Saarlouis. A second visit took place in 1953.

The first live television broadcast from the Tour de France was in 1948, when the arrival at the velodrome of Parc des Princes was broadcast live.

Teams

As was the custom since the 1930 Tour de France, the 1948 Tour de France was contested by national and regional teams.

After there had not been an official Italian team allowed in the previous edition, the Italians were back. The Italian cyclists were divided between Gino Bartali and Fausto Coppi. Both argued in the preparation of the race about who would be the team leader. The Tour organisation wanted to have both cyclists in the race, so they allowed the Italians and Belgians to enter a second team.

In the end, Coppi refused to participate, and Bartali became the team leader.

The organisation still allowed the Italians and Belgians to enter a second team, but they were to be composed of young cyclists, and were named the Italy Cadets and the Belgium Aiglons.

The Tour organisation invited the Swiss to send a team, as they wanted Ferdinand Kübler, the winner of the 1948 Tour de Suisse, in the race. Kübler refused this because he could earn more money in other races. When the brothers Georges and Roger Aeschlimann announced that they wanted to join the race, they were quickly accepted, especially because they were from Lausanne, where the Tour would pass through. They were put in a team with eight non-French cyclists living in France, and were named the Internationals.

Twelve teams of ten cyclists entered the race, consisting of 60 French cyclists, 24 Italian, 22 Belgian, 6 Dutch, 4 Luxembourgian, 2 Swiss, 1 Polish and 1 Algerian cyclist.

The teams entering the race were:

 Belgium
 Netherlands/Luxembourg
 Internationals
 Italy
 France
 Belgium Aiglons
 Italy Cadets
 Centre/South-West
 Île-de-France/North-East
 West
 Paris
 South-East

Route and stages

Bartali's three stage wins in a row was the last time that happened, until Mario Cipollini achieved four in a row in 1999. There were five rest days, in Biarritz, Toulouse, Cannes, Aix-les-Bains and Mulhouse.

Race overview

As the Italian team had not entered the Tours de France of 1939 and 1947, it was the first Tour de France for Bartali since his victory ten years before in 1938. His results in the Giro d'Italia had not been well, and it was not thought that Bartali could compete for the win.

Bartali however won the sprint in the first stage, and thanks to the bonification of one minute for the winner, he was leading the race. After that, the Italian team took a low profile in the race.
In the second stage, Bartali lost the lead already; although his teammate Vincenzo Rossello won the stage, Belgian Jan Engels took over the yellow jersey.

In the third stage, a group escaped and built up a lead of almost 14 minutes. Among that group was Louison Bobet, and as he was the best-placed cyclist in that group he became the next leader. Also in that group was Roger Lambrecht; when Lambrecht again was able to be in the first group in the fourth stage, he took the lead, becoming the fourth rider in four stages to don the yellow jersey. Lambrecht kept it in the next stage, but after Bobet won the sixth stage, Bobet took back the lead, and the yellow jersey made him confident. In the Pyrenées, Bartali won both stages in a sprint, but Bobet was near and became the hero of the French spectators.

After the ninth stage, Bobet had built up a lead of more than nine minutes. In the tenth stage, he lost time, and Belgian cyclist Roger Lambrecht reduced the margin to 29 seconds. After the eleventh stage, Bobet was still in the lead, but was having problems, and after he fainted at the finish, he wanted to give up. After a meal, massage and sleeping, he changed his mind, and won the twelfth stage.

After the twelfth stage, Bartali was 20 minutes behind. Bartali thought about quitting the tour, but was persuaded to race on. That night, Bartali received a phone call while he was in bed. Alcide De Gasperi, prime minister of Italy, from the Christian Democratic party, told him that a few days earlier Palmiro Togliatti, leader of the Italian Communist Party, had been shot, and Italy might be on the edge of a civil war.

De Gasperi asked Bartali to do his best to win a stage, because the sport news might distract people from the politics. Bartali replied that he would do better, and win the race.
The next day, Bartali won stage 13 with a large margin. In the general classification, he jumped to second place, trailing by only 66 seconds.

In the fourteenth stage, Bartali and Bobet rode together over the Galibier and the Croix de Fer, but Bartali had been saving his energy, and left Bobet and every body else behind on the Col de Porte. Bartali won again, and took over the yellow jersey as leader of the general classification. Bobet was now in second place, eight minutes behind. The next stage, stage 15, was also won by Bartali.

The sixteenth stage was not won by Bartali, but because his direct competitors lost time, he increased his lead to 32 minutes. Bartali lost minutes in the time trial in stage 17, but his lead was never endangered.

With each stage win of Bartali (seven in total), the Italian excitement about the Tour de France increased, and the political tensions quieted.

Classification leadership and minor prizes

The time that each cyclist required to finish each stage was recorded, and these times were added together for the general classification. If a cyclist had received a time bonus, it was subtracted from this total; all time penalties were added to this total. The cyclist with the least accumulated time was the race leader, identified by the yellow jersey.

The budget of the Tour de France in 1948 was 45 million Francs, from which one third was provided by private enterprises. In total, 7 million Francs of prizes were awarded in the 1948 Tour de France. Of these, 600.000 Francs were given to Bartali for winning the general classification.

Bartali is the only cyclist to win two Tours de France ten years apart. Of the 120 cyclists, 44 finished the race.

Points for the mountains classification were earned by reaching the mountain tops first.

There were two types of mountain tops: the hardest ones, in category A, gave 10 points to the first cyclist, the easier ones, in category B, gave 5 points to the first cyclist.

The team classification was calculated by adding the times in the general classification of the best three cyclists per team.

The Souvenir Henri Desgrange was given in honour of Tour founder Henri Desgrange in the opening few kilometres of stage 1 at the summit of the Côte de Picardie in Versailles, Paris. This prize was won by Roger Lambrecht. The Tour de France in 1948 for the first time had a special award for the best regional rider. This was won by third-placed Guy Lapébie.

Final standings

General classification

Mountains classification

Team classification

Aftermath
The 1948 Tour de France first showed the strengths of Louison Bobet. Bobet would be the first rider to win three consecutive Tours de France, from 1953 to 1955. After the race, the Italian team manager Alfredo Binda said about Bobet: "If I would have directed Bobet, he would have won the Tour."

Coppi, who had not competed in the 1948 Tour de France because of his bad relationship with Bartali, would enter and win the 1949 Tour de France.

Notes

References

Bibliography

External links

 
1948 in French sport
1948
1948 in road cycling
June 1948 sports events in Europe
July 1948 sports events in Europe
1948 Challenge Desgrange-Colombo